Loksa may refer to several places in Estonia:

Loksa, town in Harju County
Loksa, Kuusalu Parish, village in Kuusalu Parish, Harju County
Loksa, Lääne-Viru County, village in Tapa Parish, Lääne-Viru County

See also
Lokša